Stoke Lane Slocker is a cave near Stoke St Michael, in the Carboniferous Limestone of the Mendip Hills, in the English county of Somerset.

It is 2.18 km in length and reaches a depth of 30m.

It was previously known as Stoke Lane Swallet, but now the local name is preferred. The origin of the word "Slocker" is obscure, possibly from "slock" meaning to entice or lure away  although the Gaelic word for swallow hole is "sluighaire".

History 
It is believed that the first person to explore the cave in modern times was a Mr Marshall from Stratton-on-the-Fosse around 1905, but major exploration and measurement of this cave really started in 1947 when Sump 1 was reached. That sump was passed the same year and the decorated chambers of Stoke Two discovered. Sumps 2 to 7 were passed over the course of the 1960s. The Bailey-Ward series of chambers was discovered in 1971.

Cases of Weils Disease have been reported in those who have been into the cave.

Description 
The submerged entrance to the cave lies near the disused Stoke Lane Quarry, and from it an underground stream emerges into daylight to feed a water-source known as St Dunstan's Well. The cave has been designated as a Site of Special Scientific Interest.

Stoke One (the length of passage between the entrance and Sump 1), is mainly made up of low passageways.

The once-spectacular formations in the Princess Grotto have suffered damage since the cave was discovered. When the Bone Chamber, which is not decorated, was found it contained a number of human and animal bones, along with ash and charcoal.

Beyond the second sump is a long stretch of passage containing a further six sumps.

See also 
 Caves of the Mendip Hills

References

External links 
 

Caves of the Mendip Hills
Limestone caves